The following is a list of music awards and/or nominations earned by the U.S. singer-songwriter CeCe Peniston, along with her music recording sales certifications and entries in the year-end charts.

Over her over twenty years long career, Peniston released only three solo studio albums: Finally (1992), Thought 'Ya Knew (1994) and I'm Movin' On (1996) - each on A&M Records. She was still active, though, in recording singles also the last decade. Her fourth set CeCe, originally slated for its release in August 2011 on the independent label West Swagg Music Group, was not released by now.

Apart from being a Soul Train Music Award-nominee in 1993, Peniston won three ASCAP awards, three WMC awards, one Billboard Music Video Award and a BMI Award (all for her debut album). She topped one year-end chart as Top Dance Music Club Play Artist of 1994 and received five sales certifications.

Before entering the music industry, Peniston participated in beauty competitions and was crowned Miss Black Arizona in 1989, and Miss Galaxy in 1990. In addition, she was honored by the Governor's Key to the State of Arizona, and inducted into the Phoenix College Hall of Fame.

Music awards and nominations

ASCAP Awards 
The American Society of Composers, Authors and Publishers (ASCAP) is a not-for-profit performance rights organization that protects its members' musical copyrights by monitoring public performances of their music, whether via a broadcast or live performance, and compensating them accordingly. Peniston won three awards:

Notes
 A  Steve Hurley received two ASCAP Writer's Awards for the songs recorded with Peniston. One for "Keep On Walkin'", while two years later another for "I'm Not Over You".

Billboard Music Video Awards 
The Billboard Music Awards are sponsored by Billboard magazine. The awards are based on sales data by Nielsen SoundScan and radio information by Nielsen Broadcast Data Systems. Peniston holds one award:

Notes
 B  Claude Borenzweig, the director of "Finally" music video, won the category Best Director - Dance.

BMI Awards 
Broadcast Music, Inc. (BMI) is one of three United States performing rights organizations, along with ASCAP and SESAC. It collects license fees on behalf of songwriters, composers, and music publishers and distributes them as royalties to those members whose works have been performed. Peniston received one award:

Grammy Awards 
The Grammy Awards are awarded annually by the National Academy of Recording Arts and Sciences in the United States. Peniston was not nominated. However, two remixes of her own compositions, "Nobody Else" and "He Loves Me 2" (#24 on the US Dance), both co-written and performed by herself, brought the four time Grammy-nominee Steve "Silk" Hurley his first two nominations as Remixer of the Year, Non-Classical (in 1999 and in 2000).

Soul Train Music Awards 
The Soul Train Music Awards is an annual award show aired in national broadcast syndication that honors the best in African American music and entertainment established in 1987. Peniston was nominated once (but lost in favor of the album What's the 411? by Mary J. Blige):

VH1 Awards 
VH1: 100 Greatest Dance Songs of All Time was a five-part series compiled by the music channel in 2000 that tracked mostly the disco era. The show, hosted by Paula Abdul, featured interviews, original commentaries, archival clips and rare concert footage.

Notes
 C  The series won Gloria Gaynor's hit "I Will Survive" from 1979. "Finally" finished as the 29th. In 2006, the Slant Magazine published its own list of 100 Greatest Dance Songs, Peniston was not included though.

WMC Awards 
The Winter Music Conference (WMC) is a weeklong electronic music conference that is aimed at professionals such as artists, DJs, record label representatives (A&R), producers, promoters, radio and the media. Peniston scored three awards:

Music recording sales certifications 
Music recording sales certification is a system of certifying that a music recording has shipped or sold a certain number of copies. The number of sales or shipments required for a silver, gold, (multi-)platinum or diamond threshold depends on the population of the territory in which the title is released. These certificates are not automatic; the record label must pay a fee to have carried out an audit into the release in question.

BPI certifications 
The British Phonographic Industry (BPI) is the UK record industry's trade association. The level of the award varies and certificates are usually awarded on the basis of the amount of units the release has shipped, rather than the amount it has sold. Peniston received two certifications:

CRIA certifications 
The Music Canada, formerly known as Canadian Recording Industry Association (CRIA), represents the interests of Canadian companies that create, manufacture and market sound recordings. Similarly to the BPI, they provide audio or video certifications, using only different thresholds. Peniston received one certified award:

RIAA certifications 
The Recording Industry Association of America (RIAA) operates an award program for the releases that sell a large(r) number of copies. Peniston received two certifications:

Year-end charts 
Year-end charts are usually calculated by an inverse-point system based solely on a title's performance during any given chart year.

Australia 
ARIA
ARIA singles/albums chart is issued weekly by the Australian Recording Industry Association, and the charts are a record of the highest selling singles and albums in various genres in the country. Top 100 End of Year chart profiles the whole year in music.

Kent Music Report
Kent Music Report was a weekly record chart of Australian music singles and albums, compiled by David Kent from 1974 to 1998. Afterwards, RIAA, who had been using the report under license for a number of years, chose to produce their own charts as the 'ARIA Charts'.

Canada 
MuchMusic Countdown
MuchMusic Countdown, originally sponsored by Coca-Cola (as the Coca-Cola Countdown) is a ninety-minute music video program block aired on Canadian music television station MuchMusic.

RPM
The Canadian singles/albums chart was originally published by magazine RPM. Since November 2000, the Jam! Canoe website publishes a comprehensive collection of the official Canadian record charts (as compiled by Nielsen SoundScan). Peniston entered a RPM Year-End Dance/Urban chart:

Netherlands 
Nederlandse Top 40
Dutch Top 40 is one of the three official singles charts in the Netherlands. Apart from Single Top 100, the Top 40 and Mega Top 50 include airplay data (i.e. the more often a song is played on the radio, the higher it is placed also in the chart). Peniston scored in one Dutch singles year-end chart (compiled by the Top 40 list) of 1992 with two her songs:

United Kingdom 
Music Week
UK Top 75 is compiled by The Official Charts Company (OCC) and published in Music Week magazine. The full list of Top 200 selling singles/albums in the United Kingdom is published exclusively in ChartsPlus. Unlike the U.S. charts, no airplay statistics are used for the UK list.

United States 
American Top 40
American Top 40 is an international independent radio program that counts down the forty most popular songs in the United States of America. However apart from the US, the show is distributed by Premiere Radio Networks also in Canada, Australia, the Philippines, Singapore, China, India, the United Kingdom, Malaysia and several other territories. The AT40 charts are based on Mediabase data, published each Tueasday in USA Today. From 1990 to 1994, AT40 compiled its own year-end charts, which were very close to Billboard's, actually.

Billboard
The U.S. Billboard Year-End charts are a cumulative measure of a single or album's performance in the United States, based upon the Billboard magazine charts during any given chart year. Peniston topped one U.S. end of year chart, being nominated in total twenty-nine times:

Cashbox
Cashbox, the most prominent competitor of Billboard and Record World (previously known as Music Vendor), was a weekly magazine that published charts of song popularity in the United States of America.

Club Chart
Club Chart is a U.S. list of Top 50 dance music/electronic songs. The chart is compiled monthly by a panel of DJs from across the States since 2003, and published via DanceMusic.about.com, an online resource.

Notes
 D  The song shared the 85th position in the Club Year-End chart with Nelly Furtado's hit Maneater in common.

Record Research
Record Research Inc. was founded by the world-renowned musicologist Joel Whitburn who, along with a team of researchers, examines in detail all of Billboard'''s music and video charts in addition. His annual pop listings therefore differ.

Traxsource
Traxsource is a leading U.S.-based dance music digital music downloads site that specialize in Underground music (such as House, Soulful, Deep, Jackin, Tech, Electro, Progressive, Indie Dance, Space Disco, Soul/Funk/Disco), providing various bitrates and formats for each download.

 Others 
Music VF
Music VF is a music database combining the U.S. and UK music charts entries since the 19th century. The U.S. charts information is based on Billboard'''s charts, while the British on the Official UK Charts Company stats.

Beauty pageants

Miss Black Arizona 
The Miss Black Arizona Scholarship Pageant was developed to promote cultural awareness and celebration of black women and girls in the state of Arizona. The program is open to contestants ages 3–27 with six divisions and titles granted each year.

Miss Galaxy 
Miss Galaxy is a beauty contest for girls and women between 16 and 28 years old, with eligibility requirements of size XS/S/M.

Other honors

See also 
 CeCe Peniston's discography
 List of artists who reached number one on the US Dance chart

References

External links 
 CeCe Peniston.com

Awards
Peniston, CeCe